The naira (sign: ₦; code: NGN;) is the currency of Nigeria. One naira is divided into 100 kobo.

The Central Bank of Nigeria (CBN) is the sole issuer of legal tender money throughout the Federal Republic of Nigeria. It controls the volume of money supplied in the economy in order to ensure monetary and price stability. The Currency Operations Department of the CBN is in charge of currency management, through the designs, procurement, distribution and supply, processing, reissue and disposal or disintegration of bank notes and coins.

A major cash crunch occurred in February 2023 when the Nigerian government used a currency note changeover—delivering too few of the new notes into circulation—to attempt to force citizens to use a newly-created government-sponsored central bank digital currency.  This led to extensive street protests.

History
The history of the currency according to the government.

The naira was introduced on 1 January 1973, replacing the Nigerian pound at a rate of £1 = ₦2. The coins of the new currency were the first coins issued by an independent Nigeria, as all circulating coins of the Nigerian pound were all struck by the colonial government of the Federation of Nigeria in 1959, with the name of Queen Elizabeth II on the obverse. This also made Nigeria the last country in the world to abandon the £sd currency system in favour of a decimal currency system. There was a government plan to redenominate the naira at 100:1 in 2008, but the plan was suspended.

The name "Naira" was coined from the word "Nigeria" by Obafemi Awolowo. However, Naira as a currency was launched by Shehu Shagari as minister of finance in 1973.

The Central Bank of Nigeria claimed that they attempted to control the annual inflation rate below 10%. In 2011, the CBN increased key interest rate six times, rising from 6.25% to 12%. On 31 January 2012, the CBN decided to maintain the key interest rate at 12%, in order to reduce the impact of inflation due to reduction in fuel subsidies.

As of 20 June 2016, the naira was allowed to float, after being pegged at ₦197 to US$1 for several months. Trade speculated the natural range of the naira would be between ₦280 and ₦350 to the dollar.

In October 2021, the eNaira, the digital version of the state currency, was officially launched in Nigeria.

The 2023 Nigerian currency crisis was precipitated in February 2023 by a shortage of naira cash currency and an attempt by the Nigerian government to force citizens to use a newly-created government-sponsored central bank digital currency.  This led to extensive street protests in mid-February 2023.

Coins
Nigerian central bank info as of 2022 is in this source:

The  kobo coins were minted only that year. In 1991, smaller 1, 10 and 25 kobo coins were issued in copper-plated-steel, along with nickel-plated-steel 50 kobo and ₦1. On 28 February 2007, new coins were issued in denominations of 50 kobo, ₦1 and ₦2, with the ₦1 and ₦2 bimetallic. Some Nigerians expressed concerns over the usability of the ₦2 coin. The deadline for exchanging the old currency was set at 31 May 2007.
  kobo
 1 kobo 
 5 kobo
 10 kobo
 25 kobo
 50 kobo
 1 naira
 2 naira

Banknotes

On 1 January 1973, the Central Bank of Nigeria introduced notes for 50 kobo, ₦1, ₦5, ₦10 and ₦20: in April 1984, the colors of all naira banknotes were changed in an attempt to control money laundering. In 1991, ₦50 notes were issued, while the 50 kobo and ₦1 notes were replaced by coins in 1991. This was followed by ₦100 in 1999, ₦200 in 2000, ₦500 in 2001 and ₦1,000 on October 12, 2005.

On 28 February 2007, new versions of the ₦5 to ₦50 banknotes were introduced. Originally the ₦10, ₦20 and ₦50 were to be polymer banknotes, but the ₦5, ₦10 and ₦50 were delayed to late 2009 and only the ₦20 was released in polymer. The notes are slightly smaller (130 × 72 mm) and redesigned from the preceding issues. In mid-2009 when Sanusi Lamido Sanusi took over as CBN Governor, The Central Bank of Nigeria changed the ₦5, ₦10 and ₦50 to polymer notes.

On the ₦1,000 notes, there is a subtle shiny strip running down the back of the note to prevent counterfeiting. The strip is a shimmery gold color showing ₦1,000, and has a triangular shape in the middle of the front of the note which changes its color from green to blue when tilted. The main feature on the front is the engraved portraits of Alhaji Aliyu Mai-Bornu and Dr. Clement Isong, both of which are former governors of the Central Bank of Nigeria.

On the first prints of the ₦100 notes issued starting December 1, 1999, Zuma Rock was captioned as located in Federal Capital Territory, while actually it is situated in Niger State. Later prints removed the reference to FCT, ABUJA.

In 2012 the Central Bank of Nigeria was contemplating the introduction of new currency denominations of ₦5,000. The bank also made plans to convert ₦5, ₦10, ₦20 and ₦50 into coins which are all presently notes.

The Central Bank of Nigeria announced that it would no longer issue banknotes on polymer citing higher costs and environmental issues.

On 12 November 2014, the Central Bank of Nigeria issued a ₦100 commemorative note to celebrate the centennial of Nigeria's existence. The notes are similar to its regular issue with the portrait of Chief Obafemi Awolowo on the front, but are redesigned to include a new color scheme, revised security features, and the text "One Nigeria, Great Promise" in microprinting. On the back is a quick response code (QRC) which when scanned leads users to a website about Nigeria's history.

In 2019, the naira attained a landmark when it featured the signature of Priscilla Ekwere Eleje, the new Director of Currency operations of the Central Bank of Nigeria and the first woman to hold the post.

Second naira

The naira was scheduled for redenomination in August 2008, although this was cancelled by then-President Umaru Musa Yar'Adua, with 100 old naira to become 1 new naira. The Nigerian Central Bank stated that it would make the naira fully convertible against foreign currencies by 2009. Currently, the amount of foreign currency is regulated through weekly auctions, while the Central Bank sets the exchange rate. The naira appreciated against the dollar through 2007 due to high oil revenues. Also, the then-Bank Governor, Professor Chukwuma Soludo noted the weekly central bank auctions of foreign currency will gradually be phased out, and that the bank would "only intervene in the market as may be required to achieve defined policy objectives". 

Coins and banknotes, and their security features, are described on the website of the Central Bank of Nigeria.

Coins

Coins were to be issued in denominations of:
- 1 kobo (₦0.01)
- 2 kobo (₦0.02)
- 5 kobo (₦0.05)
- 10 kobo (₦0.10)
- 20 kobo (₦0.20)
- 50 Kobo (₦0.50)
- 1 Naira (₦1)
Due to inflation, Nigerian coins are all essentially worthless now. Each coin has an extremely low value. As of 13 March, 2023 1 Naira coin worth 2 US cents.

Banknotes

Banknotes were to be printed in denominations of:
 5 naira (₦5)
 10 naira (₦10)
 20 naira (₦20)
 50 naira (₦50)
 100 naira (₦100)
 200 naira (₦200)
 500 naira (₦500)
 1000 naira (₦1000)
50 kobo & 1 naira — no longer in use
5 naira - had lesser value in 2018, and as of November 2022 has a much weakened purchasing power.

2022 redesign

In 2022, the Central Bank of Nigeria (CBN) under President Muhammadu Buhari led administration expressed the decision to redesign the naira as a statutory responsibility and a way to curb the increased circulation of counterfeit notes in the country. The CBN governor, Mr Godwin Emefiele expressed that the approval for the redesign was granted by the president of the country in fighting corruption, terrorism, kidnapping and other unlawful practices. He said the higher naira denominations have been the denomination mostly used by the perpetrators of the acts which includes ₦100, ₦200, ₦500 and ₦1,000 notes.
President Muhammadu Buhari officially unveiled the new notes at the state house after 19 years since the naira was redesigned.
The newly redesigned naira notes were planned to be printed by The Nigerian Security Printing and Minting Company Limited which will make the country one out of the four Africa countries who print their currencies locally and not import from foreign countries.

In November 2022, CBN, Nigeria's apex bank, informed the citizens that the new notes will be issued from 15 December 2022 onward, and that old naira notes need to be returned to the banking system before 31 January 2023 when they will cease to be legal tender. The deadline to exchange banknotes was extended to February 2023.

The redesign is controversial. There have been shortages of the new bank notes at ATMs, necessitating some Nigerians to wait in long lines or sleep on the sidewalk waiting for ATMs to be reloaded.

Hidden naira notes
In 2022, Nigeria's central bank expressed the scarcity of the currency due to high volume of the naira kept outside the banking system and attributed to be hoarded by politicians.

Exchange rates

The official exchange rate set by the Central Bank of Nigeria: naira to U.S. dollar is approximately ₦441.33 per 1 US dollar. This rate is almost two times different from the illegal black market exchange rate.
The Black Market exchange rate of the naira to the U.S. dollar is approximately ₦752.50 per 1 US dollar.

This table shows the historical value of one U.S. dollar in Nigerian naira. PM = parallel market.

See also
Economy of Nigeria

References

External links
Interview with Sanusi Lamido Sanusi, Governor of the Central Bank of Nigeria, on the Australian Broadcasting Corporation's Four Corners television program on the scandal involving the transfer from paper to polymer currency in Nigeria

Circulating currencies
Currencies of the Commonwealth of Nations
Currency symbols
Currencies of Nigeria
Currencies introduced in 1973